Liv Inger Somby (born 1962) is a Sámi educator, writer, and journalist. She specializes in indigenous journalism which she teaches at the Sámi University of Applied Sciences in Kautokeino in the north of Norway.

Born in the village of Guohppenjavvi, Karigasniemi, Utsjoki on the Finnish side of the Sápmi border, she now lives in Kautokeino, Norway. She is one of only three people who have earned a master's degree in indigenous journalism in Norway. She has since worked in Norway, Sweden and Finland, both as a freelance and for the Swedish and Norwegian national broadcasting corporations.

As a journalist, Somby has reported on Sámi news and features for over 30 years. A member of Norway's  Truth and Reconciliation Commission, she has also worked in Sweden, Finland and Russia. She heads the Sámi Broadcasting Council (or Sámi Programme Council) at NRK Sápmi.

In the mid-1990s, Somby undertook a study of 27 Sami women who reported on their earlier experiences and their impressions of what life for the Sami peoples had been like a hundred years ago. Many of them had been persuaded to marry against their will while some told of how children had frozen to death on the way to school. As many of the stories were dramatic or violent, they remained as tape recordings for over 20 years. Only in 2017 did she decide to publish 12 of them.

References

External links
Liv Inger Somby's profile on LinkedIn

1962 births
Living people
Norwegian Sámi-language writers
Norwegian journalists
Academic staff of the Sámi University of Applied Sciences
Norwegian women writers
Norwegian women academics
People from Northern Norway